Di'Shon Joel Bernard (born 14 October 2000) is an English professional footballer who plays as a centre-back for  club Portsmouth, on loan from  club Manchester United.

Bernard joined the Manchester United youth system in 2017. He made his professional debut for the club in a UEFA Europa League game against Astana in November 2019. He has also spent time on loan at Salford City, where he made 31 appearances in the 2020–21 season, and Hull City.

Club career
Bernard joined the Manchester United academy at the age of 16 in 2017, having previously progressed through Chelsea's youth system. He made his senior debut in a Europa League match against Astana on 28 November 2019, however he scored an own goal as United lost 2–1.

Bernard moved on loan to League Two club Salford City on 16 October 2020. His Salford debut came on 24 October, being brought on in the 61st minute as a substitute for Oscar Threlkeld in a 1–1 draw with Crawley Town. He scored his first goal for the club on 2 December, scoring a header in stoppage time in a 2–1 loss to Carlisle United. On 15 January 2021, the loan was extended to the end of the season. Bernard would say that going out on loan to Salford was vital to his development as a player, and was hoping that by doing so he could follow in the footsteps of Axel Tuanzebe, who became a first-team regular after several loan spells. He was cup-tied for Salford's victory in the 2020 EFL Trophy Final which was played in March 2021.

On 30 July 2021, Bernard signed a season-long loan deal with Championship club Hull City.
He made his debut on 10 August 2021, in an EFL Cup first round match against Wigan Athletic which went to penalties after a 1–1 draw.

On 31 January 2023, Bernard joined League One club Portsmouth on loan until the end of the 2022–23 season.

International career
Born in England, Bernard is of Jamaican descent and has expressed an interest in representing the Jamaica national team.

Career statistics

References

External links
Profile at the Manchester United F.C. website

2000 births
Living people
English footballers
English sportspeople of Jamaican descent
Association football defenders
Manchester United F.C. players
Hull City A.F.C. players
Black British sportspeople
Salford City F.C. players
English Football League players